Matthew David Bahr (born July 6, 1956) is a former professional American football placekicker in the National Football League (NFL), and professional soccer player in the North American Soccer League. He attended Neshaminy High School in Langhorne, Pennsylvania where he excelled in both football and soccer.  He is the son of National Soccer Hall of Fame inductee Walter Bahr, and is the brother of NFL kicker Chris Bahr.

College and soccer career
As a senior at Penn State, in 1978, Bahr was a consensus All-America selection. In 1978, he signed with the Colorado Caribous of the North American Soccer League, for whom he made 24 appearances and made three assists. The Caribous traded him to the Tulsa Roughnecks during the season, and he made two appearances. On March 27, 1979, he signed with the Pennsylvania Stoners of the second division American Soccer League.

Professional football career
In 1979, he was drafted by the Pittsburgh Steelers in the sixth round of the 1979 NFL Draft.  His brother Chris Bahr followed a similar career path. Over his career, which spanned from 1979 to 1995, he played for the Pittsburgh Steelers, the San Francisco 49ers, the Cleveland Browns, the New York Giants, the Philadelphia Eagles and the New England Patriots. As a rookie, he won a Super Bowl ring with the Steelers in Super Bowl XIV.  In 1981, Bahr signed with the 49ers, but was traded to the Cleveland Browns midway through the season, thus missing out on a second Super Bowl ring (the 49ers went on the win the Super Bowl that year).  After discovering he had been traded, Bahr left a note on his San Francisco locker stating, "See you in the Super Bowl."  While this did not happen (the Browns went 5–11 in 1981), Bahr did get some retribution against his former team when he kicked a game winning field goal to give the Browns a 15–12 victory over San Francisco in week 11.

His longest tenure was with the Browns where he played for nine years and was cut during the 1990 preseason. In late September of that season he was picked up by the New York Giants after a repetitious injury to Raul Allegre. He is best remembered for his performance in the 1990 NFC Championship Game on January 20, 1991, as he set an NFC Championship Game record with five field goals (including a 42-yarder as time expired) to lift the Giants past the 49ers 15–13. He also kicked what would prove to be the decisive field goal in Super Bowl XXV on January 27, 1991, as the Giants beat the Buffalo Bills 20–19, also recording a tackle on the opening kickoff.

Bahr played the final seasons of his career with the New England Patriots.  In 1996, rookie kicker Adam Vinatieri beat him out for the starting kicker spot on the team, and he decided to retire after being cut by Patriots during the preseason.

Bahr held the record for longest span for a player between Super Bowl victories at 11 years, until Ray Lewis of the Baltimore Ravens went 12 years from Super Bowl XXXV in 2001 to Super Bowl XLVII in 2013.

Bahr finished his 17 seasons with 300 of 415 field goals and 522 of 534 extra points.  Overall, he scored a total of 1,422 points.

At the time of his retirement, Bahr was the last active NFL player that played for the Steelers in at least one of their four Super Bowl wins in the 1970s. Coincidentally, his last year in the NFL saw the Steelers return to the Super Bowl that season in Super Bowl XXX, their first Super Bowl appearance since his rookie season.

Career regular season statistics

Career high/best bolded

Personal life
He appeared in the 1980 television movie, Fighting Back: The Rocky Bleier Story.

He is now an electrical engineer in Pittsburgh, Pennsylvania.

References

External links
NFL stats
NASL stats

1956 births
Living people
Soccer players from Philadelphia
North American Soccer League (1968–1984) players
American soccer players
Players of American football from Philadelphia
Penn State Nittany Lions men's soccer players
American football placekickers
Cleveland Browns players
Colorado Caribous players
New England Patriots players
New York Giants players
Penn State Nittany Lions football players
Pennsylvania Stoners players
Philadelphia Eagles players
Pittsburgh Steelers players
San Francisco 49ers players
Tulsa Roughnecks (1978–1984) players
Footballers who switched code
Association football defenders
Association football players that played in the NFL